Eois brunneicosta is a moth in the family Geometridae. It is found in Panama.

References

Moths described in 1916
Eois
Moths of Central America